Abdallah Hijazi is a Lebanese basketball player with Sporting Al Riyadi Beirut of the Lebanese Basketball League.

References

Lebanese men's basketball players
1982 births
Living people
People from Sidon
Forwards (basketball)
Al Riyadi Club Beirut basketball players